Trochocarpa gunnii, commonly known as sweet-scented trochocarpa or fragrant purpleberry, is a common understory shrub from the plant family Ericaceae (originally Epacridaceae) native to Tasmania.

External links

gunnii